The Usenet newsgroup alt.religion.scientology (often abbreviated a.r.s or ARS) started in 1991 to discuss the controversial beliefs of Scientology, as well as the activities of the Church of Scientology, which claims exclusive intellectual property rights thereto and is viewed by many as a dangerous cult. The newsgroup has become the focal point of an aggressive battle known as Scientology versus the Internet, which has taken place both online and in the courts.

Creation of the newsgroup 
On July 17, 1991, the alt.religion.scientology newsgroup was created by Scientology critic Scott Charles Goehring after a discussion with his then girlfriend and a third party. Goehring describes starting the newsgroup "because I felt Usenet needed a place to disseminate the truth about this half-assed religion" and in part as a joke.

Newsday inaccurately reported that Goehring started the newsgroup to demonstrate the behaviour of Scientologists to his girlfriend. The original Usenet newgroup message used to create the newsgroup was formatted in a manner to disguise the actual identity of the poster.  A bogus email address, "miscaviage@flag.sea.org" (a misspelling of "David Miscavige", the current head of Scientology's Religious Technology Center), was inserted into the newsgroup creation message.  Because of this, persons speaking in favor of Scientology frequently claim that "a forgery" was used to create the newsgroup.  Scientology has used this argument in its requests to have the entire newsgroup removed from Usenet, but this argument has been nearly unanimously rejected by system administrators and ISPs alike.

Rmgroup controversy 

The online "war" first came to the attention of Internet users in general when Scientology lawyer Helena Kobrin attempted to remove the entire newsgroup from Usenet.  On January 11, 1995, an rmgroup message (a command designed to remove a newsgroup) was posted to Usenet containing the following statement:

This message was largely ignored (and openly protested) by system administrators who carried the newsgroup. It also led to a declaration of war by hacker group Cult of the Dead Cow. Rather than being removed from Usenet, the newsgroup exploded in popularity.  For a period during the first half of 1995, the newsgroup was one of the most popular and active on the entire Internet, with message traffic greater than the vast majority of newsgroups.

Rogue cancels and flooding
Articles posted to Usenet can be canceled by a special control message (normally from the original sender). Starting in 1995, large numbers of rogue cancels were posted to the newsgroup by a cancelbot dubbed "Cancelbunny", mainly against critical articles containing portions of the "Advanced Technology" documents. To counteract this, other programs were used to repost the canceled articles. In parallel with this, floods of articles containing excerpts of publicly available Church of Scientology material were spammed to the newsgroup. (In a nine-day period in May 1996, an estimated 20,000 messages were sent.)

Activity
In 2006 Alt.religion.scientology was one of the more popular newsgroups on Usenet, averaging three to four hundred messages per day. The total number of readers is unknown, but Google reports over 8,800 subscribers to the newsgroup through Google Groups.

Critics of Scientology claim that Scientologists are forbidden from reading or accessing the newsgroup. As evidence, they point to the software package sometimes dubbed "Scieno Sitter" by critics. This software package, described as an "Internet filter", was part of a "Web starter kit" distributed by the Church. The stated purpose of the starter kit was to make it as easy as possible for Scientologists to create personal websites (hosted by the Church) promoting Scientology.  The Church did not disclose the other purpose of the starter kit:  the "Scieno Sitter" program blocks users from accessing the newsgroup alt.religion.scientology, as well as many Web sites containing information critical of Scientology, and references to the names of many vocal critics of the organization.  If terms matching the software's list of forbidden words appear, the software may blank them from a web page, kick the user from the chatroom where the words appeared, or even shut down their browser altogether.

See also

List of newsgroups
Scieno Sitter
Sporgery, common Usenet phenomenon named by an a.r.s. regular

Notes

References

 Article, The Net: Copyright Or 'Free Press' by Thomas Maier, October 10, 1995.
 Article,

External links
Church of Scientology Censors Net Access for Members 
alt.religion.scientology through groups.google.com
ARS FAQ
 Scientology fought the Internet—and why it lost (Daily Dot)

Usenet alt.* hierarchy
Scientology and the Internet